Ceropegia huberi is a species of plant in the family Apocynaceae.

Description
Ceropegia huberi is a trailing, twining monsoonal herb with underground tuber. The leaves are hairy, lance-shaped. It differs from any other Indian Ceropegia in having pure white, depressed star-shaped corolla, instead of a tubular elongated one.

Range and habitat
It is a very rare trailing, twining herb restricted to the highest reaches of the Western Ghats hills in Pune and Kolhapur district. It has not been reported from any other areas.
This species is restricted to the Northern Western Ghats, India.
It occurs on rocky cliffs at altitudes above 1000m ASl

Taxonomy
Named after Dr. Huber for his great contribution to the taxonomy of Ceropegia.

References

https://www.flowersofindia.net/catalog/slides/Huber%27s%20Ceropegia.html
https://www.inaturalist.org/taxa/781622-Ceropegia-huberi

Flora of India (region)
huberi